Kevin Kowalski may refer to:

 Kevin Kowalski (skateboarder) (born 1992), American skateboarder
 Kevin Kowalski (American football) (born 1989), American football center